Merge Records is an independent record label based in Durham, North Carolina. It was founded in 1989 by Laura Ballance and Mac McCaughan. It began as an outlet for music from their band Superchunk and music created by friends, and has expanded to include artists from around the world, with records reaching the top of the Billboard music charts.

History
After releasing a number of 7" records and cassettes, the first Merge Records full-length CD release came on April 1, 1992, with MRG020 Superchunk—Tossing Seeds, the band's first collection of singles.

Merge's early successes included Neutral Milk Hotel's In the Aeroplane over the Sea, The Magnetic Fields's 69 Love Songs, and Spoon's Kill the Moonlight.

The label's first album to reach the Billboard 200 was Arcade Fire's Funeral, a 2004 release. Arcade Fire gave the label its then highest-charting release with their follow-up, 2007's Neon Bible, which debuted at #2 on the Billboard 200, and, later, reaching #1 with their third album, 2010's The Suburbs. Other Billboard Top Ten releases include Spoon's Ga Ga Ga Ga Ga and Transference, along with She & Him's (actress/musician Zooey Deschanel along with M. Ward, a popular Merge folk musician) Volume Two. Other notable Merge releases include Caribou's Polaris Prize-winning Andorra, M. Ward's Hold Time, Camera Obscura's Let's Get Out of This Country, and She & Him's Volume One.

In February 2009, due to adverse market conditions it was announced that Touch and Go Records would no longer manufacture and distribute records for Merge and many other independent record labels; Merge had been "under the Touch and Go umbrella" ever since its 1992 release of Tossing Seeds. Merge quickly reached an agreement with the Alternative Distribution Alliance to continue distribution of its releases.

In September 2009, Algonquin Paperbacks released Our Noise: The Story of Merge Records, a book chronicling the label's history. This followed a 6-day music festival in Chapel Hill and Carrboro, NC, featuring over 40 Merge acts from around the world celebrating the 20th anniversary of the label's first release. The label also released a subscription-only 17-disc box set SCORE! 20 Years of Merge Records throughout the 20th anniversary year curated by pop culture tastemakers such as David Byrne, Amy Poehler, Zach Galifianakis, Jonathan Lethem, Peter Buck, David Chang, Mindy Kaling and more, with all proceeds going to charities.

In August 2010, Merge Records released Arcade Fire's The Suburbs to critical acclaim, preceding the band's headlining appearance at Lollapalooza. The album went straight to number one on the U.S. and U.K. charts. Famed director and Monty Python member Terry Gilliam also directed a live online broadcast of the band's concert from the historic Madison Square Garden in New York following the album's release, which was streamed live by an estimated 1.8 million unique viewers. The Suburbs won the Grammy for Album of the Year at the 53rd Annual Grammy Awards on February 13, 2011.

Artists
List of artists adapted from Merge Records website.

 The 3Ds
 The 6ths
 A Giant Dog
 American Music Club
 Amor De Días
 Angels of Epistemology
 Apex Manor
 Arcade Fire
 Archers of Loaf
 Ashley Stove
 Eric Bachmann
 Lou Barlow
 Barren Girls
 Beatnik Filmstars
 Dan Bejar
 Big Dipper
 Breadwinner
 Bricks
 The Broken West
 Richard Buckner
 Will Butler
 Butterglory
 Buzzcocks
 Cable Ties
 The Cakekitchen
 Camera Obscura
 Caribou
 The Clean
 The Clientele
 Hollie Cook
 Mikal Cronin
 Crooked Fingers
 Allison Crutchfield
 Daphni
 Destroyer
 Dinosaur Jr
 Divine Fits
 Drive Like Jehu
 East River Pipe
 Mark Eitzel
 Matt Elliott
 Erectus Monotone
 The Essex Green
 Ex Hex
 The Extra Lens
 Flesh Wounds
 Flock of Dimes
 Martin Frawley
 Eleanor Friedberger
 Friendship
 Fruit Bats
 Fucked Up
 Future Bible Heroes
 Ganger
 Gauche
 The Gothic Archies
 Guv'ner
 Coco Hames
 Annie Hayden
 HeCTA
 Hiss Golden Messenger
 Honor Role
 Hospitality
 Benji Hughes
 Ibibio Sound Machine
 Imperial Teen
 The Karl Hendricks Trio
 David Kilgour
 King Khan and the Shrines
 Julian Koster
 Mike Krol
 The Ladybug Transistor
 Lambchop
 Let's Wrestle
 Little Scream
 The Love Language
 The Mad Scene
 The Magnetic Fields
 Mac McCaughan
 H.C. McEntire
 Stephin Merritt
 Bob Mould
 Mount Moriah
 The Mountain Goats
 Mt. Wilson Repeater
 The Music Tapes
 Neutral Milk Hotel
 The New Pornographers
 Oakley Hall
 Conor Oberst
 Ought
 Pipe
 Robert Pollard
 Polvo
 Portastatic
 Pram
 Radar Bros.
 Redd Kross
 Reigning Sound
 Dawn Richard
 The Rock*A*Teens
 The Rosebuds
 Sacred Paws
 Saint Rich
 Seaweed
 Shark Quest
 She & Him
 Shout Out Louds
 Sneaks
 Spaceheads
 Spent
 Spider Bags
 The Spinanes
 Spoon
 Sugar
 Matt Suggs
 Superchunk
 Swearin'
 Sweet Spirit
 Teenage Fanclub
 Telekinesis
 Tenement Halls
 The Third Eye Foundation
 Tracey Thorn
 Times New Viking
 Titus Andronicus
 Torres
 Tracyanne & Danny
 Twerps
 William Tyler
 Versus
 Vertical Scratchers
 Volcano Suns
 M. Ward
 Waxahatchee
 White Whale
 Wild Flag
 Wwax
 Wye Oak

See also
 Merge Records discography

References

External links
 Official website

 
American independent record labels
Record labels established in 1989
Alternative rock record labels
Indie rock record labels
Companies based in Chapel Hill-Carrboro, North Carolina
Music of North Carolina
1989 establishments in North Carolina